Acts 5 is the fifth chapter of the Acts of the Apostles in the New Testament of the Christian Bible. It records the growth of the early church and the obstacles it encountered.

Text

The original text was written in Koine Greek and is divided into 42 verses.

Textual witnesses
Some early manuscripts containing the text of this chapter are:
 Uncial 0189 (~AD 200)
 Codex Vaticanus (325–350)
 Codex Sinaiticus (330–360)
 Papyrus 8 (4th century; extant verses 2–9)
 Papyrus 57 (4th century; extant verses 1–2, 8–10)
 Codex Bezae (~400)
 Codex Alexandrinus (400–440)
 Codex Ephraemi Rescriptus (~450; extant verses 35–42)
 Codex Laudianus (~550)

Ananias and Sapphira (5:1–11)
The narrative underlines the authority of Peter, who could see through the deception by Ananias and Sapphira (verses 3–5, 8–9) and highlights the spiritual authority of the "church" (Greek: ekklesia, first used in Acts in verse 11) in form of  'signs' of God (inducing 'great fear' in verses 5 and 11, as well as healing miracles in the next section). The sin of the couple was not simply the dishonesty on monetary value of the land sale, but rather the conspiracy to deceive the community (Greek: koinonia), which is a 'symptom of a more serious failure to be "of one mind" within the community' (cf. Ephesians 4:25; Colossians 3:9), that is,  lying to the community equals to  'lying to God' (verse 4) and 'tempting the Holy Spirit' (verse 9; cf. Philippians 2:1-2 and 2 Corinthians 13:14).

Signs and wonders (5:12–16)
This section summarizes the 'ongoing healing ministry of the apostles' which increases the reputation of the believers of Christ among 'the people' (verse 13), because the bringing out of
the sick for healing in public is a manifestation of 'belief (verse 15) which recalls the popularity of Jesus' healing ministry (cf. Luke 4:40-1, 6:18-19). The healing power coming out of Peter is so wonderful that it does not need even to touch him (verse 15: cf. Luke 7:1–10; 8:43).

Arrest and escape (5:17–26)
In the previous chapter, the apostles received a 'blanket prohibition on teaching in the name of Jesus', which their
disdainfully rejected, then before long, the authority arrested and placed the whole apostolic group in jail (verse 18). The apostles were soon miraculously released by an 'angel of the Lord', who instructed them to continue preaching in the temple (verses 19–21).

The trial (5:27–32)
This trial is 'essentially a reprise' of the previous one (Acts 4), with the charge of 'direct disobedience of an explicit instruction' (verse 28).
raised and exalted by God to a position on his 'right hand', as a 'precondition for the outpouring of [spiritual] gifts' of 'repentance and forgiveness of sins now offered to Israel' (verses 31–32).

Verse 29
 But Peter and the other apostles answered and said: "We ought to obey God rather than men."

The advice of Gamaliel (5:33–39)

Rabban Gamaliel the Elder was one of the great Pharisaic teachers of the first century (flourished c. 25–50 CE) and is later said to have been the teacher of Paul (Acts 22:3). As a member of the Sanhedrin he began to question the wisdom of pursuing the case, which would be the main theme of the whole account: 'to recognize where God is at work'. The examples he cited — Theudas and Judas of Galilee — are both mentioned in the same order by a first-century historian, Josephus (Ant. 20.97–98, 102); but assigned to different time periods, with Judas linked to the time of the Roman census of Judea (cf. Luke 2:1-2) and Theudas dated by Josephus to procuratorship of Fadus (44–46 CE), which would happen after the account in this chapter.The date of the trial must be before the death of Herod in 44 CE. Alexander 2007, p. 1036. The dating aspect is debated with arguments in favor of Luke or of Josephus, or the possibility of different Theudas and Judas.

Verse 34
Then one in the council stood up, a Pharisee named Gamaliel, a teacher of the law held in respect by all the people, and commanded them to put the apostles outside for a little while.
As Luke had mentioned that there was an influential party of Sadducees in the Sanhedrin, it is specifically noted here that Gamaliel was a Pharisee, who was well-respected to provide balancing opinions to the counsels of the Sadducean members, especially regarding the Resurrection (cf. ). Gamaliel is known in the Talmud as "Rabban Gamaliel the Elder" (to distinguish him from his grandson of the same name, "Gamaliel the Younger"), the grandson of Hillel the Elder, the head of the school of Hillel, at some time president of the Sanhedrin, one of the most famous Jewish doctors (the title Rabban is given to only six others), and one whose greatness would be as a shield to his students (Acts 22:3).

Summary and transition (5:40–42)
Following Gamaliel's advice, the Sanhedrin  treated the apostles with caution, but nonetheless sentenced them to flogging (verse 40). The punishment was received by apostles with 'joy' (verse 41) as they considered it 'worthy to be dishonored for the Name' as martyrs.
The section concludes with an assurance that 'the gospel message is assiduously proclaimed, not only in the temple but from house to house'.

Verse 42
And daily in the temple, and in every house, they did not cease teaching and preaching Jesus as the Christ.
The temple and private houses are 'two fields of labour' to teach and preach.

See also 
 Ananias and Sapphira
 Gamaliel
 Jerusalem
 Sanhedrin
 Simon Peter
 Related Bible parts: Acts 2, Acts 22

References

Sources

External links
 King James Bible - Wikisource
English Translation with Parallel Latin Vulgate
Online Bible at GospelHall.org (ESV, KJV, Darby, American Standard Version, Bible in Basic English)
Multiple bible versions at Bible Gateway (NKJV, NIV, NRSV etc.)

05